This is a list of Canadian films which were released in 1999:

See also
 1999 in Canada
 1999 in Canadian television

External links
Feature Films Released In 1999 With Country of Origin Canada at IMDb

1999
1999 in Canadian cinema
Canada